Hanoi International School is an elementary and secondary school in Ba Đình District, Hanoi, Vietnam. It is an accredited member of the Council of International Schools (CIS) and the East Asia Regional Council of Overseas Schools (EARCOS). HIS is also a founding member of the Mekong River International Schools Association (MRISA) 
, an organization of six schools in the region who participate in regular sporting, arts and STEAM competitions/exhibitions.

History
Hanoi International School opened its doors in 1996 using premises leased from a school next to its current campus. The school enrollment at the end of the first year was 54 students from preschool age to Grade 11. The school continued to grow and moved to the current purpose-built location in the 1999–2000 academic year. The student enrollment stands at 289 students from pre-kindergarten to Grade 12, representing 32 nationalities. The average enrollment of students is 3–4 years.

Curriculum
HIS is an International Baccalaureate Continuum school. It offers the IB Primary Years Program for students in grades Kindergarten to Grade 5, the IB Middle Years Programme for students in grades 6 to 10, and the IB Diploma Program for students in Gr. 11 and 12.

References

External links

Mekong River International Schools Association (MRISA)
International schools in Hanoi
High schools in Hanoi